P.Sivakozhundu is an Indian politician and incumbent Member of the Tamil Nadu Legislative Assembly from the Panruti constituency. He represents the Desiya Murpokku Dravidar Kazhagam party.

References 

Living people
Desiya Murpokku Dravida Kazhagam politicians
Year of birth missing (living people)
Tamil Nadu MLAs 2011–2016
Place of birth missing (living people)